Xenodorella is a genus of tephritid  or fruit flies in the family Tephritidae.

Species
Xenodorella mira Munro, 1967

References

Tephritinae
Tephritidae genera
Diptera of Africa